Jean Ruiz (born 6 April 1998) is a French professional footballer who plays as a centre-back for  club Pau.

Career
Ruiz began his professional career with Sochaux in Ligue 2, before moving to Sion in Switzerland on 17 July 2019.

On 1 January 2022, he joined Boulogne on loan until the end of the season.

In June 2022, Ruiz signed with Pau.

Career statistics

Club

References

External links
 
 FFF Profile

1998 births
Living people
Sportspeople from Haut-Rhin
Association football midfielders
French footballers
France youth international footballers
FC Sion players
FC Sochaux-Montbéliard players
US Boulogne players
Pau FC players
Swiss Super League players
Ligue 2 players
Championnat National players
Championnat National 2 players
Championnat National 3 players
French expatriate footballers
French expatriate sportspeople in Switzerland
Expatriate footballers in Switzerland
Footballers from Alsace